The Caproni CH.1 was a single-seat biplane fighter, a single example of which was produced as a prototype in Italy in 1935.

Design
Antonio Chiodi began design work on a new single-seat fighter in 1934 as a private venture of the Caproni company. He designed the Caproni CH.1—"CH" standing for "Chiodi"—an aerodynamically clean single-bay biplane of all-metal construction, with fabric skin and wings of equal span. The aircraft had spatted landing gear. The cockpit was enclosed, with a canopy that opened by sliding to the rear.

The CH.1s proposed armament was two fixed forward-firing 7.7-millimeter (0.303-inch) Breda-SAFAT machine guns synchronized to fire through the propeller.

Operational history
Chiodi himself piloted the CH.1 on its first flight, which took place in May 1935. After the Caproni company finished its tests, the Regia Aeronautica (Italian Royal Air Force), tested the CH.1 at Guidonia Montecelio in July and August 1935. Although powered by an engine of lower power than its designer intended, the CH.1 had an exceptional rate of climb.

Tests ended when the CH.1 flipped over onto its back during a landing and was damaged in August 1935. The Regia Aeronautica did not place a production order, and no further examples were built.

Specifications (CH.1)

Notes

References

 

Ch.1
Caproni Ch.1
Biplanes
Single-engined tractor aircraft
Aircraft first flown in 1935